Mohamed Hashi Dirie, commonly known as Lihle was a Somali military leader, colonel of the Somali National Army and later the commander of the military wing of the Somali National Movement. He belonged to the Farah Mohamed branch of the Musa Abdallah subclan of the Habr Yunis.

Biography

Early life and career
Lihle attended the SOS Sheikh Secondary School for boys. Once he graduated he joined the Somali military. As he was among the most skilled officers, he was sent to the Soviet Union for further advanced-level training. Upon his return Lihle was stationed at the Kismayo Military academy where he trained the next generation of army cadets. Lihle participated in the Ogaden War and was considered a War hero within the Somali Armed Forces.  During the course of his army career he held the ranks of first and second lieutenant (Xidigle), Captain (Dhamme), Major (Gaashaanle), Lieutenant Colonel (Gaashaanle Dhexe) and Colonel (Gaashaanle sare). The latter rank is the third-highest a commissioned officer can achieve in the Somali National forces.

Somali National Movement
Due to the increasing corruption, tribalism and nepotism of the Siad Barre regime, Lihle joined the Somali National Movement, an organization consisting mainly of members of the Isaaq clan. The SNM was created with the aim of  liberating the northern regions from Barre's government. While still a colonel of the SNA he coordinated clandestine anti-government activity within the armed forces. In 1979 Afraad battalion leader and later SNM hero Mohamed Ali was arrested in Mogadishu for fighting against the Ogadeni WSLF faction, Lihle using his influence within the military released him from prison. Lihle acted as an inside man and facilitated the defection of Isaaq military officers and their safe passage to Ethiopia. He eventually defected himself and became head of the SNM's military wing. Lihle conceived, planned and executed the most successful military operation against the Somali government on January 2, 1983. Leading SNM fighters from Haud bases, he assaulted Mandera Prison near Berbera and released a group of Isaaq political prisoners. According to SNM sources, the attack freed hundreds of prisoners; subsequent independent estimates suggested that 700 political prisoners were released. At the same time, SNM commando units invaded the Adadley armoury near Berbera and escaped with an undetermined amount of arms and ammunition. It was considered the "most striking initial military success" of the SNM. Lihle's leadership is said to have created a more cohesive, highly organized and disciplined force.

Lihle's speech to the freed Mandera prisoners:
O prisoners, you are from everywhere.'- Now we will release you. You have three options to choose from: (1) whoever wants to join the SNM, as we are fighting  the regime, you can come and join the Jihad (struggle); (2) whoever wants to go and join his family, we will help you get back home; (3) whoever wants to join the regime, you should know we pushed them back to Abdaal when we came; so go to them and we will not do anything to you until you reach them. But be careful: we might attack you later and then our bullets will hurt you. So choose one of these options.

New African Magazine in 1989 states:
The SNM is very popular among the Somalis especially in the Northern Regions. Within the six year period that they were  operating from Ethiopia, they carried out many successful military operations and created military heros like Mohamed Ali, Colonel Lihle, and Captain Ibrahim Kodbur.

Death
In October 1984 the SNM commando units led by Colonel Lihle clashed with the SNA at the Somali-Ethiopia border town of Burao-Durey. The SNM suffered heavy losses and Lihle died on the battlefield. His death was considered a major blow to the SNM movement. Lihle is considered a hero in Somaliland and has roads and districts named after him.

See also
Mohamed Farah Dalmar Yusuf
Hassan Adan Wadadid
Abdiqadir Kosar Abdi
Abdirahman Ahmed Ali

References

See also
Hassan Adan Wadadid
Abdiqadir Kosar Abdi

1984 deaths
Colonels (military rank)
Defectors
Siad Barre
Somali clans
Somali National Movement
Somalian military leaders
Somaliland people